The Fitz Henry Lane House is a historic house at 8 Harbor Loop Road, on the harbor side of Rogers Street in Gloucester, Massachusetts. The three story stone Gothic Revival building was designed and built in 1849 by the artist Fitz Henry Lane, and was his home until his death in 1865.  The building now sits in a municipal park, and has a commanding view of the harbor.

The house was listed on the National Register of Historic Places in 1970.  At that time, it was known as the "Fitz Hugh Lane House," but the Register changed the name in 2010.

See also
National Register of Historic Places listings in Gloucester, Massachusetts
National Register of Historic Places listings in Essex County, Massachusetts

References

Houses in Gloucester, Massachusetts
Houses on the National Register of Historic Places in Essex County, Massachusetts
Houses completed in 1849
Artists' studios in the United States
Gothic Revival architecture in Massachusetts